Tony Alvarez may refer to:

El Potro Álvarez (born 1979), Venezuelan former baseball player and politician
Tony Alvarez (actor) (1956–1997), Spanish-born actor resident in Australia
Tony Álvarez (Cuban singer), Cuban TV singer and actor

See also
Antonio Álvarez (disambiguation)